White Oleander is a 2002 American drama film directed by Peter Kosminsky. The film stars Alison Lohman in the central role of Astrid Magnussen and Michelle Pfeiffer as her manipulative mother, Ingrid, with Robin Wright, Noah Wyle and Renée Zellweger in supporting roles. The screenplay was adapted from Janet Fitch's 1999 novel White Oleander, which was selected for Oprah's Book Club in May 1999.

Plot
Astrid Magnussen, 15, lives in Los Angeles with her free-spirited artist mother Ingrid. Too young to remember her father, she relies heavily upon her self-centered mother.

Ingrid's relationship with a writer, Barry, ends when she discovers he is cheating. Murdering him with white oleander poison, Ingrid is incarcerated, leaving Astrid under social services' control.

Starr Thomas, a former stripper, recovering alcoholic and born-again Christian is Astrid's first foster mother. Initially interacting well, Astrid is baptised into her church. Ingrid finds out, setting Astrid against them. Believing Astrid is sleeping with Starr's live-in boyfriend Ray, she falls off the wagon. In a drunken rage, she argues with Ray, then shoots Astrid in the shoulder. Starr and Ray disappear; the children beg her not to report her, so Astrid plays along.

Astrid recovers in a hospital before being moved to McKinney Children's Center (aka "Mac"). After fighting with some girls, she befriends fellow artist, Paul Trout.

Astrid is placed with former actress, Claire Richards, and her producer husband Mark. Fragile but affectionate, Claire bonds closely with Astrid, who finally thrives. One day, Astrid discovers Ingrid has been corresponding with Claire and insists on meeting. At the prison visit, Ingrid’s jealously exploits Claire's low self-esteem and suspicions over Mark's fidelity, which worsens her depression. Later, a bad fight with Mark makes Claire consider sending Astrid back. She begs her not to, she seems to recant, only to commit suicide that night, devastating Astrid.

Astrid tells Ingrid of Claire's death, and that she was returned to Mac. Blaming her for the suicide, Astrid announces she won't visit again. In Mac, Paul tells Astrid that as he turns 18 soon he will move to New York. He asks her to join him but she coldly refuses.

Astrid passes up good foster parent candidates for Russian immigrant Rena Gruschenka, who uses kids as laborers for her flea market business. With Rena, she becomes colder and colder with her outward appearance, matching her inside demeanor. Her mother's attorney Susan Vallares, charmed by her mother approaches Astrid, offering anything she wants in exchange for lying for her in court, as her mother has benefactors.

As Astrid refuses, Rena tells her she's stupid to turn down money. Rena offers to make her an equal partner in her business, saying she has nowhere better to go. When she balks at the idea, Rena tells her to use her mother like her mother wants to use her.

Astrid surprises Ingrid one final time in prison. Now she has black hair, harsh makeup, and dark clothes. In control over her mother for once, Astrid demands answers about her past in exchange for testifying that Barry committed suicide. She hammers her with questions about Barry, her father, Claire, and Annie, whom Astrid vaguely recalls from her toddler years.

Annie was a neighbor who kept Astrid for over a year while Ingrid went wild. Astrid's father came looking for her when she was 8, but she turned him away. Devastated by these revelations, Ingrid claims she would undo all she has done. Although Astrid begs her to not make her testify, she refuses.

Astrid seeks letters from Paul from a comic book shop. He soon shows up in LA and they renew their relationship. He accompanies her to her mother's trial as she waits to testify. The courtroom empties and she goes to see what happened. Susan explains that Ingrid instructed her to not include Astrid's testimony. Ingrid and Astrid stare at one another as she is led away. Gutted, Astrid watches as her mother is taken back to prison. Paul asks what happened, and she says her mother finally let her go.

Two years later, a blond-again Astrid lives in NYC with Paul, tending to her art: dioramas in suitcases depicting her life up to that point. As she passes them, she closes each stating she will never visit the horrors they contain again. Pausing at the final one depicting Ingrid, Astrid reflects that although flawed, she knows her mother loves her.

Cast
Alison Lohman as Astrid Magnussen
Robin Wright as Starr Thomas
Michelle Pfeiffer as Ingrid Magnussen
Renée Zellweger as Claire Richards
Billy Connolly as Barry Kolker
Svetlana Efremova as Rena Gruschenka
Patrick Fugit as Paul Trout
Cole Hauser as Ray
Noah Wyle as Mark Richards
Amy Aquino as Ms. Martinez
Liz Stauber as Carolee

Production

Principal photography for "White Oleander" began on April 23, 2001. Filming took place in Santa Clarita, California.

Barbra Streisand turned down offers to direct the film and play Ingrid Magnussen.

Alison Lohman wore a wig throughout filming because she had just finished playing a cancer patient in deleted scenes from the film Dragonfly (2002).

The film clip Claire (Renée Zellweger) shows Astrid as an example of her acting career is of Zellweger's own early performance in The Return of the Texas Chainsaw Massacre (1994).

Release

Reception
White Oleander holds a rating of 70% on Rotten Tomatoes and a score of 61 on Metacritic, indicating generally favorable reviews.

Stephen Holden, writing for The New York Times, called it a "rich, turbulent adaptation," and described the performances as "superbly acted from top to bottom." Comparing it to other films on the same theme – Anywhere but Here (1999), Tumbleweeds (1999), and The Divine Secrets of the Ya-Ya Sisterhood (2002) – Holden found White Oleander to be the only one to show "how children instinctively absorb their parents' attitudes and personalities." Andrew Sarris, writing for The Observer, named it as a runner-up on his list of the ten best English-language films of 2002. Roger Ebert, writing for the Chicago Sun-Times, was critical of the film, writing, "The performances are often touching and deserve a better screenplay."

The performances were widely acclaimed, particularly those of Pfeiffer and Lohman. The New York Times called Pfeiffer's role the "most complex screen performance of her career... at once irresistible and diabolical", while the Los Angeles Times singled out her "riveting, impeccable performance in what is literally and figuratively a killer role." Variety described it as a "daring, unsympathetic performance". Lohman's work was variously described as "the year's most auspicious screen acting début", a "tremendously weighty and extended role... [taken on] with great confidence" and an "awesome performance".

Accolades
Pfeiffer won the Kansas City Film Critics Circle Award for Best Supporting Actress and the San Diego Film Critics Society Award for Best Supporting Actress, and received a nomination for the Screen Actors Guild Award for Outstanding Supporting Actress.
Zellweger was nominated for the Satellite Award for Best Supporting Actress – Motion Picture.

Lohman was nominated for the Phoenix Film Critics Society Award for Best Newcomer.

Marc Donato won a Young Artist Award in the category of Best Performance in a Feature Film – Supporting Young Actor.

Home media
White Oleander was released on VHS and DVD by Warner Home Video on March 11, 2003 and includes special features such as the theatrical trailer, interviews with the cast and creators, behind the scenes footage, deleted scenes, an audio commentary with Peter Kosminsky, John Wells and Janet Fitch, and Cast and Crew film highlights.

Umbrella Entertainment re-released White Oleander on DVD in December 2011. The DVD is compatible with all region codes and includes all the special features from the original DVD release.

References

External links

Movie stills

2000s teen drama films
American coming-of-age films
American teen drama films
Films scored by Thomas Newman
Films based on American novels
Films directed by Peter Kosminsky
Warner Bros. films
2002 drama films
Films about mother–daughter relationships
2000s English-language films
2000s American films